The 2022 FIBA Asia Champions Cup was a cancelled international basketball club tournament of FIBA Asia. The competition would have been the 29th season of the FIBA Asia Champions Cup, and cancelled for the third consecutive year due to the COVID-19 pandemic. The competition would have taken place from 26 September to 1 October 2022. The league would have featured 8 teams.

The champions would have qualified for the 2023 FIBA Intercontinental Cup.

The competition has been cancelled due to COVID-19 pandemic.

Qualification
The league champions of the Chinese Basketball Association (CBA), Korean Basketball League (KBL), Philippine Basketball Association (PBA) and B.League qualify directly for the group stage. The four other teams would have qualified through the Sub-Zone Qualifiers.

Team allocation
1st, 2nd, etc.: Place in the domestic competition
TH: Title holder
CW: Cup winner
QT: National qualification tournament

Teams
The following teams had qualified for the 2022 FIBA Asia CC:

References

2022
Champions Cup
Asia Champions Cup 2022